Kevin Leahy is a Gaelic footballer who plays for the Ballymun Kickhams club and, formerly, for the Dublin junior team.

Playing career
Leahy opened his 2007 Junior campaign with Dublin by scoring a total of 0-10 (0-9f) against Louth in the quarter final of the Leinster Junior Football Championship. Dublin then progressed to the semi-final against neighbours Wicklow. Leahy continued with his impressive scoring for Dublin by getting 0-8 (0-3f, 0-1 '45'). This leaves him with a total of 0-18 (0-12f, 0-1 '45') in the 2007 Junior championship. Dublin meet Wexford in the final as they beat last years champions Meath by 2-14 to 2-09. Leahy continued with his scoring but his four points weren't enough to seal the victory against Wexford in the final. Wexford beat Dublin by 1-10 to 1-08 at Wexford Park.

Kevin won the 2012 Dublin Senior Football Championship with Ballymun Kickhams against Kilmacud Crokes at Parnell Park.

References

Year of birth missing (living people)
Living people
Ballymun Kickhams Gaelic footballers
Dublin Gaelic footballers 
Gaelic football forwards